Goob Weyn (Somali: Goobweyn) is a village in the southern Lower Juba region of Somalia.

Geography 
Goobweyn is situated on the banks of the Jubba River, and is only 3 meters above sea level. The village is situated next to Kismayo National Park, and is situated only 15 kilometers outside of Kismayo.

Exports and livelihood 
A primarily agricultural based town based on the Jubba Basin, residents of Goobweyn primarily depend on agricultural exports to the nearby city of Kismayo, like tomatoes, onions, and coconuts. 

In 1974, the area saw an influx of refugees following The Lingering Drought (Somali: Abaartii Dabadheer) in northern Somalia. Northern families were introduced to ways of fishing and farming compared to pastoralist livestock herding.

References 

Goob Weyn, Somalia

Populated places in Lower Juba